John Albert Riley Jr. (December 30, 1935 – August 19, 2016) was an American actor, comedian and writer. He was known for playing Elliot Carlin, a chronic psychology client of the main character on The Bob Newhart Show, and for voicing Stu Pickles, one of the parents in the animated Rugrats franchise.

Early life
Riley was born in Cleveland, Ohio, the son of Agnes C. Riley (née Corrigan) and John Albert Riley. After attending Saint Ignatius High School and John Carroll University, he served in the U.S. Army.

After being discharged, Riley became a popular radio personality in Cleveland, along with his radio partner and "straight man" Jeff Baxter; The Baxter & Riley Show on WERE (1300 AM) featured not only music but comedy sketches and a slew of offbeat characters that Riley and Baxter voiced. Riley gave up the radio show in the mid-1960s and moved to Los Angeles, where his Cleveland friend Tim Conway helped him obtain work writing comedy sketches, which later led to acting opportunities.

Career
First a semi-regular in the cast of the 1960s sitcom Occasional Wife, a short-lived show on NBC in which he played Wally Frick, Riley was perhaps most famous for playing Elliot Carlin, the neurotic, sour, and selfish patient on The Bob Newhart Show 1972–1978. In 1973, he was cast as Gomez Addams in The Addams Family Fun-House, then in 1979, he starred in ABC's holiday telefilm The Halloween That Almost Wasn't (a.k.a. The Night Dracula Saved The World) as Warren the Werewolf (Wolf Man) of Budapest. Riley then, in 1980, appeared in a comedy special for HBO called The Wild Wacky Wonderful World of Winter. He was a regular cast member in The Tim Conway Show, a comedy-variety show that aired on CBS from March 1980 through late summer 1981, acting in sketch comedy in each episode. In 1985, he reprised his Bob Newhart Show role of Elliot Carlin on St. Elsewhere, and did so again in a 1987 episode of ALF.

Among his other TV credits are multiple appearances on such shows as Rowan & Martin's Laugh-In (parodying Lyndon Johnson), M*A*S*H, Barney Miller, Hogan's Heroes, The Mary Tyler Moore Show, One Day at a Time, Gomer Pyle, Diff'rent Strokes, and Night Court. He was also a favorite of Mel Brooks, appearing in several of his films: High Anxiety (1977), History of the World: Part I (1981), To Be or Not to Be (1983), and (cameo only) Spaceballs (1987).

Riley often provided voiceovers for television and radio commercials, most notably in spots for Country Crock margarine. He also voiced the character "P.C. Modem, the computer genius" in radio commercials for CompUSA that aired in the 1990s. In the 1990s and early 2000s, Riley was known for voicing Stu Pickles (father of the main protagonist Tommy) in the animated series Rugrats. The franchise consisted of the TV series, the spin-off All Grown Up! and the film trilogy.

He continued to make guest appearances during the 1990s in popular sitcoms, showing up in episodes of Seinfeld, Son of the Beach, Friends, Coach, The Drew Carey Show, That '70s Show, and, in a gag appearance, as an unnamed but obvious Mr. Carlin in a 1988 episode of Newhart. He made a cameo appearance on the November 23, 2013, episode of Saturday Night Live, as a subway passenger during the sketch "Matchbox 3". That episode would be his final acting role.

Personal life
Riley married Ginger Lawrence on January 3, 1970; together they had two children.

Death
Riley died on August 19, 2016, at age 80 in Los Angeles, due to pneumonia.

Filmography

Film

Television

Video games

Crew work
The Don Rickles Show (1968, 1 episode) - Writer
The Many Sides of Don Rickles (1970) - Writer
The Addams Family Fun House (1973) - Writer

References

External links

1935 births
2016 deaths
American male film actors
20th-century American male actors
American male television actors
American male voice actors
American male comedians
20th-century American comedians
21st-century American comedians
John Carroll University alumni
Male actors from Cleveland
Saint Ignatius High School (Cleveland) alumni
Deaths from pneumonia in California